The 1970–71 NBA season was the 25th season of the National Basketball Association. The season ended with the Milwaukee Bucks winning the NBA Championship, beating the Baltimore Bullets 4 games to 0 in the NBA Finals. Three new teams made their debut: the Cleveland Cavaliers, the Portland Trail Blazers, and the Buffalo Braves.

Notable occurrences 
 The NBA expanded to 17 teams as the Portland Trail Blazers, Buffalo Braves, and Cleveland Cavaliers began play. For the first time, the league was divided into Conferences (East and West), each with two divisions. The Detroit Pistons and Milwaukee Bucks were shifted from the old Eastern Division to the Western Conference's Midwest Division, and the Atlanta Hawks were switched from the Western Division to the Eastern Conference's Central Division.
 The 1971 NBA All-Star Game was played at the San Diego Sports Arena in San Diego, California, with the West beating the East 108–107. Lenny Wilkens of the Seattle SuperSonics won the game's MVP award.
 The Rookie of the Year award was shared by two players for the first time in league history. They were Dave Cowens of the Boston Celtics and Geoff Petrie of the Portland Trail Blazers.
 In only their third year of existence, the Bucks won the NBA Championship, sweeping the Baltimore Bullets in four straight games. This was the first NBA finals to feature none of the NBA's foundation franchises; the Bullets franchise had joined the NBA as the Chicago Packers in 1961, and the Bucks franchise had joined in 1968. It was also the first NBA finals since 1956 to feature neither Bill Russell or Wilt Chamberlain.

Final standings

By division

By conference

Notes
z, y – division champions
x – clinched playoff spot

Playoffs

Statistics leaders

NBA awards
Most Valuable Player: Lew Alcindor, Milwaukee Bucks
Co-Rookies of the Year: Geoff Petrie, Portland Trail Blazers and Dave Cowens, Boston Celtics
Coach of the Year: Dick Motta, Chicago Bulls

All-NBA First Team:
G – Dave Bing, Detroit Pistons
G – Jerry West, Los Angeles Lakers
C – Lew Alcindor, Milwaukee Bucks
F – Billy Cunningham, Philadelphia 76ers
F – John Havlicek, Boston Celtics

All-NBA Second Team:
F – Gus Johnson, Baltimore Bullets
F – Bob Love, Chicago Bulls
C – Willis Reed, New York Knicks
G – Walt Frazier, New York Knicks
G – Oscar Robertson, Milwaukee Bucks

All-NBA Rookie Team:
Geoff Petrie, Portland Trail Blazers
Bob Lanier, Detroit Pistons
Calvin Murphy, San Diego Rockets
Dave Cowens, Boston Celtics
Pete Maravich, Atlanta Hawks

NBA All-Defensive First Team:
Dave DeBusschere, New York Knicks
Gus Johnson, Baltimore Bullets
Nate Thurmond, San Francisco Warriors
Walt Frazier, New York Knicks
Jerry West, Los Angeles Lakers

NBA All-Defensive Second Team:
John Havlicek, Boston Celtics
Paul Silas, Phoenix Suns
Lew Alcindor, Milwaukee Bucks
Jerry Sloan, Chicago Bulls
Norm Van Lier, Cincinnati Royals

See also
1971 NBA Finals
1971 NBA playoffs
1970–71 ABA season

References